Mosunmola Filani  is a Nigerian film and voice actress.

Early life and education
Mosun was born in Ibadan to parents from Ikole Ekiti. She was raised with four other siblings. She attended Abeokuta College of Education and earned a degree in Business Administration from Tai Solarin University of Education.

Acting career
Mosun has starred in several Nollywood movies, especially Yoruba films and radio productions since 2005. She has also received several nominations including Best Actress in a supporting role in the 2009 and 2011 Best of Nollywood Awards.

Personal life
Mosun's father died in 2015. She is married to a lawyer-politician: Kayode Oduoye with two children.

Selected filmography
 Iku Ewa
 Ami Ayo
 Iyo Aye (2011)
 Jenifa (2009)

See also
 List of Yoruba people

References

Living people
20th-century births
21st-century Nigerian actresses
Actresses from Ibadan
Actresses in Yoruba cinema
Nigerian film actresses
Nigerian radio actors
Nigerian voice actresses
Oduoye family
Tai Solarin University of Education alumni
Year of birth missing (living people)
Yoruba actresses